Travel Washington is an intercity bus service in the U.S. state of Washington funded by the Washington State Department of Transportation (WSDOT). It has four routes that connect major cities to other modes, including Amtrak and Greyhound Lines.

History

Greyhound Lines formerly ran extensive intercity service in Washington state that was cut in 2004 as part of a regional restructure to focus on profitable routes. In 2007, the Washington State Department of Transportation began planning for an intercity bus network pilot project.

The first Travel Washington bus route to open was the Grape Line, which began service in December 2007. It was also the first bus service to be funded through a private-public partnership between the Federal Transit Administration and private operators, with the former matching the latter's investments with grant money.

The Dungeness Line's contract was transferred to Greyhound in 2018 and came with the addition of a new stop in Port Townsend.

Routes

Travel Washington consists of 4 routes connecting major cities in Washington to other intercity transit services offered by Amtrak, Greyhound and Northwestern Stage Lines, as well as regional airports in Seattle and Pasco. Most stops are sited at major transfer points with local bus systems.

Routes are named after Washingtonian products and resources, such as Dungeness crab and apples.

See also

Oregon POINT

References

External links

Bus transportation in Washington (state)
Intercity bus companies of the United States
Transportation companies based in Washington (state)